Nyråd is a town in Vordingborg Municipality, in Region Zealand, Denmark.

References  

Cities and towns in Region Zealand
Vordingborg Municipality